George Ring (9 April 1770 – 4 May 1865) was an English professional cricketer who made two known appearances in first-class cricket matches in 1796.  He was the younger brother of Joey Ring.

Ring was born at Darenth near Dartford in Kent in 1770. He played both of his first-class matches for England sides at Dandelion Paddock, Margate in 1796. He died at Bethersden in Kent in 1865 aged 95.

References

1770 births
1865 deaths
English cricketers
English cricketers of 1787 to 1825
Kent cricketers